Amari Jai Rodgers (born September 23, 1999) is an American football wide receiver for the Houston Texans of the National Football League (NFL). He played college football at Clemson and was drafted by the Green Bay Packers in the third round of the 2021 NFL Draft.

High school career
Rodgers attended Knoxville Catholic High School in Knoxville, Tennessee.  As a senior, he caught 40 passes for 1,238 yards with 18 touchdowns. For his career, he had 3,498 receiving yards with 47 total touchdowns. He was rated as a four star recruit and the 16th highest rated wide receiver recruit in the country by the 247Sports.com Composite, which aggregates the ratings of the major recruiting services. Rodgers originally committed to University of Southern California, but flipped to Clemson when they gave him an offer late in the season.

College career
As a freshman at Clemson in 2017, Rodgers had 19 receptions for 123 yards. As a sophomore in 2018, he caught 55 passes for 575 yards and 4 touchdowns. He also returned a punt for a touchdown.

Rodgers missed the first game of his junior season in 2019 due to an ACL tear in spring practice. He finished the season with 30 receptions, 426 yards, and 4 touchdowns. After the season, Rodgers announced he was returning for his senior season rather than entering the 2020 NFL Draft. As a senior, Rodgers caught 77 passes for 1,020 yards and 7 touchdowns.

Professional career

Green Bay Packers
Rodgers was drafted by the Green Bay Packers in the third round with the 85th overall pick of the 2021 NFL Draft. The Packers send their 92nd and 135th overall picks to the Tennessee Titans to move up and select Rodgers. He signed his four-year rookie contract on July 23, 2021, worth $4.89 million, including a $923,000 signing bonus. He saw his first NFL action on September 12, 2021, against the New Orleans Saints, recording one catch for 19 yards in the 38–3 loss. He finished the 2021 season with 169 yards off punt returns and 199 yards off kickoff returns with his longest being 23 and 27 yards.

During Rodgers’ second season, he proved to be inconsistent, totaling five fumbled punt returns over ten games. However, he was otherwise more efficient by nearing his 2021 totals in just over half a season, returning 139 yards off punt returns and 122 off kickoffs through week 10. In a week 10 win over the Dallas Cowboys, Rodgers lost his seventh fumble during a punt return, and was benched afterwards, replaced by cornerback Keisean Nixon. Head coach Matt LaFleur announced they would no longer ask Rodgers to return punts, and he was released by the Packers two days after the game.

Houston Texans
The Houston Texans claimed Rodgers off waivers on November 16, 2022.

NFL career statistics

Regular season

Postseason

Personal life
Rodgers is the son of football coach Tee Martin. He is close friends with former Packers teammate Randall Cobb, whom he met while Cobb was playing for Martin at the University of Kentucky.

References

External links
Clemson Tigers bio
Houston Texans bio

1999 births
Living people
Players of American football from Knoxville, Tennessee
African-American players of American football
American football wide receivers
Clemson Tigers football players
Green Bay Packers players
21st-century African-American sportspeople
Houston Texans players